The Himyarite Kingdom or Himyar (Ḥimyar;  Ṣayhadic: , Ḥmyrm), historically referred to as the Homerite Kingdom by the Greeks and the Romans (its subjects being called Homeritae), was a polity in the southern highlands of Yemen, as well as the name of the region which it claimed. Until 110 BCE, it was integrated into the Qatabanian kingdom, afterwards being recognized as an independent kingdom. According to classical sources, their capital was the ancient city of Zafar, relatively near the modern-day city of Sana'a. Himyarite power eventually shifted to Sana'a as the population increased in the fifth century. After the establishment of their kingdom, it was ruled by kings from dhū-Raydān tribe. The kingdom was named Raydān.

The kingdom conquered neighbouring Saba' in c. 25 BCE (for the first time), Qataban in c. 200 CE, and Haḍramaut c. 300 CE. Its political fortunes relative to Saba' changed frequently until it finally conquered the Sabaean Kingdom around 280. Himyar then endured until it finally fell to invaders from the Kingdom of Aksum in 525 CE.

The Himyarites originally worshiped most of the South-Arabian pantheon, including Wadd, ʿAthtar, 'Amm and Almaqah. Since at least the reign of Abikarib Asʿad (c. 384 to 433 CE), Judaism was adopted as the de facto state religion. The religion may have been adopted to some extent as much as two centuries earlier, but inscriptions to polytheistic deities ceased after this date. It was embraced initially by the upper classes, and possibly a large proportion of the general population over time.

Descendants of the Himyarites, namely the aristocratic families of Dhu'l-Kala and Dhu Asbah, played a prominent role in early Islamic Syria. They led the South Arabian contingents of the Muslim army during the conquest of Homs in 638 and contributed to making Homs a center for South Arabian settlement, culture and political power. Their chiefs supported Mu'awiya ibn Abi Sufyan against Caliph Ali in the First Muslim Civil War (656–661). Their influence waned with their defeat at the Battle of Marj Rahit against the Quda'a confederation and the Umayyad caliph Marwan I in 684 and practically diminished with the death of their leader at the Battle of Khazir in 686. Nonetheless, members of the Dhu'l-Kala and Dhu Asbah played important roles at different times through the remainder of Umayyad rule (661–750) as governors, commanders, scholars, and pietists.

History 

The Himyarite Kingdom was a confederation of tribes, several inscriptions and monumental buildings survive of this period which shows evidence of a wealthy, sophisticated, relatively literate society that had a rich variety of local gods and religions. Trade was already well established by the 3rd century AD, with Yemen supplying the Roman Empire with frankincense and myrrh. Further, the late 1st century AD writer Pliny the Elder mentioned that the kingdom was "the richest nations in the world". It was a hub of international trade, linking the Mediterranean, the Middle East and India.

The trade linking East Africa with the Mediterranean world largely consisted of exporting ivory from Africa to be sold in the Roman Empire. Ships from Ḥimyar regularly travelled the East African coast, and the state also exerted a large amount of Influence both cultural, religious and political over the trading cities of East Africa whilst the cities of East Africa remained independent. The Periplus of the Erythraean Sea describes the trading empire of Himyar and its ruler "Charibael" (probably Karab'il Watar Yuhan'emII), who is said to have been on friendly terms with Rome:

Early period 

During this period, the Kingdom of Ḥimyar conquered the kingdoms of Saba' and Qataban and took Raydan/Zafar for its capital instead of Ma'rib; therefore, they have been called Dhu Raydan. In the early 2nd century AD Saba' and Qataban split from the Kingdom of Ḥimyar; yet in a few decades Qataban was conquered by Hadhramaut (conquered in its turn by Ḥimyar in the 4th century), whereas Saba' was finally conquered by Ḥimyar in the late 3rd century.

Ẓafār's ruins cover scattered over 120 hectare on Mudawwar Mountain 10 km north-north-west of the town of Yarim. Early, Empire and Late/Post art periods have been identified. Around the same time in the north a Himyar General by the name of Nuh Ifriqis led an expedition to Barbaria and took control of eastern ports in modern-day Djibouti. Other Himyarite generals went as far as invading Rhapta in modern-day Mozambique.

By the 4th century, the rich Himyarite export of incense, which had once supplied pagan Rome in its religious offerings, now began to wane with the Christianization of Rome, contributing to a collapse in the local economy.

Jewish monarchy
The Himyarite kings appear to have abandoned polytheism and converted to Judaism around the year 380, several decades after the conversion of the Ethiopian Kingdom of Aksum to Christianity (328). No changes occurred in the people's script, calendar, or language (unlike at Aksum after its conversion). This date marks the end of an era in which numerous inscriptions record the names and deeds of kings, and dedicate buildings to local (e.g. Wagal and Simyada) and major (e.g. Almaqah) gods. From the 380s, temples were abandoned and dedications to the old gods ceased, replaced by references to Rahmanan, "the Lord of Heaven" or "Lord of Heaven and Earth". The political context for this conversion may have been Arabia's interest in maintaining neutrality and good trade relations with the competing empires of Byzantium, which first adopted Christianity under Theodosius the Great, and the Zoroastrian Sasanian Empire.

One of the first Jewish kings, Tub'a Abu Kariba As'ad (r. 390–420), is believed to have converted following a military expedition into northern Arabia in an effort to eliminate Byzantine influence. The Byzantine emperors had long eyed the Arabian Peninsula and sought to control the lucrative spice trade and route to India. The Byzantines hoped to establish a protectorate by converting the inhabitants to Christianity. Some progress had been made in northern Arabia but they had little success in Ḥimyar.

Abu-Kariba's forces reached Yathrib and, meeting no resistance, they passed through the city, leaving the king's son behind as governor. Abu-Kariba soon received news that the people of Yathrib had killed his son. He turned back in order to wreak vengeance on the city. After cutting down the palm trees from which the inhabitants derived their main income, he laid siege to the city. The Jews of Yathrib fought side by side with their pagan neighbors.

During the siege Abu-Kariba fell severely ill. Two Jewish scholars in Yathrib, Ka'ab and Asad by name, called on the king in his camp and used their knowledge of medicine to restore him to health. While attending the king, they pleaded with him to lift the siege and make peace. The sages' appeal is said to have persuaded Abu-Kariba; he called off his attack and also embraced Judaism along with his entire army. At his insistence, the two Jewish scholars accompanied the Ḥimyarite king back to his capital, where he demanded that all his people convert to Judaism. Initially, there was great resistance. After an ordeal had justified the king's demand and confirmed the truth of the Jewish faith, many Himyarites supported Judaism. Some historians argue that the people were not motivated by politics, but that Judaism, by its philosophical, simplistic, and austere nature, was attractive to the nature of the Semitic people.

Abu-Kariba continued to engage in military campaigns and met his death under unclear circumstances. Some scholars believe that his own soldiers killed him. He left three sons, Ḥasan, 'Amru, and Zorah, all of whom were minors at the time. After Abu-Kariba's demise, a pagan named Dhū-Shanatir seized the throne. In the reign of Subahbi'il Yakkaf, Azqir, the son of Abu Karib Assad and serving as a Christian missionary from Najrān, was put to death after he had erected a chapel with a cross. Christian sources interpret the event as a martyrdom at Jewish hands: the site for his execution, Najrān, was said to have been chosen on the advice of a rabbi, but indigenous sources do not mention persecutions on the grounds of faith. His death may have been intended to deter the extension of Byzantine influence.

The first Aksumite invasion took place sometime in the 5th century and was triggered by the persecution of Christians. Two Christian sources, including the Zuqnin Chronicle once attributed to Dionysius I Telmaharoyo, which was written more than three centuries later, say that the Himyarite king prompted the killings by stating, "This is because in the countries of the Romans the Christians wickedly harass the Jews who live in their countries and kill many of them. Therefore I am putting these men to death." In retaliation the Aksumites invaded the land and thereafter established a bishopric and built Christian churches in Zafar.

Conquest by Aksum
The kingdom maintained nominal control of Arabia until 525. A severe drought in the 6th century weakened the Himyarite kingdom and contributed to its eventual conquest by Aksum.

The Jewish monarchy in Ḥimyar ended with the reign of Yṳsuf, known as Dhū Nuwās, who, in 523, persecuted the Himyarite Christian population of Najrān. By the year 500, on the eve of the regency of Marthad'īlān Yanūf (c. 500–515) the kingdom of Himyar exercised control over much of the Arabian peninsula. It was during his reign that the Himyarite kingdom began to become a tributary state of Aksum, the process concluding by the time of the reign of Ma'dīkarib Yafur (519–522), a Christian appointed by the Aksumites.

A coup d'état ensued, with Dhu Nuwas, who had attempted to overthrow the dynasty several years earlier, assuming authority after killing the Aksumite garrison in Zafār. He proceeded to engage the Ethiopian guards, and their Christian allies in the Tihāma coastal lowlands facing Abyssinia. After taking the port of Mukhawān, where he burnt down the local church, he advanced south as far as the fortress of Maddabān overlooking the Bab-el-Mandeb, where he expected Kaleb Ella Aṣbeḥa to land his fleet. The campaign eventually killed between 11,500 and 14,000, and took a similar number of prisoners. Mukhawān became his base, while he dispatched one of his generals, a Jewish prince named Sharaḥ'īl Yaqbul dhu Yaz'an, against Najrān, a predominantly Christian oasis, with a good number of Jews, who had supported with troops his earlier rebellion, but refused to recognize his authority after the massacre of the Aksumite garrison. The general blocked the caravan route connecting Najrān with Eastern Arabia.

Religion
During this period, references to pagan gods disappeared from royal inscriptions and texts on public buildings, and were replaced by references to a single deity. Inscriptions in the Sabean language, and sometimes Hebrew, called this deity Rahman (the Merciful), “Lord of the Heavens and Earth,” the “God of Israel” and “Lord of the Jews”. Prayers invoking Rahman's blessings on the “people of Israel” often ended with the Hebrew words shalom and amen. 

There is evidence that the solar goddess Shams was especially favoured in Himyar, being the national goddess and possibly an ancestral deity.

Military 
As the Byzantines were usually equipped with such of horses armour, Indian fenestrated battle axe, round shield, spear, and scale or mail armour, Paul Yule presumed the Himyarite soldiers  armed in comparable fashion, if not systematically as such.

Language

It is a matter of debate whether the Ṣayhadic Himyarite language was spoken in the south-western Arabian peninsula until the 10th century. The few 'Himyarite' texts seem to be rhymed.

List of rulers

Himyarite dynasties after the coming of Islam

After the spread of Islam in Yemen, Himyarite noble families were able to re-establish control over parts of Yemen.
 Yufirid Dynasty over most of Yemen (847–997)
 Mahdid Dynasty over Southern Tihama (1159–1174)
 Manakhis over Taiz (ninth century)

Many Himyarites participated in the Muslim conquest of Syria in the 630s and, along with other South Arabian tribes, settled in city of Homs after its capture in 637. The city became the center of these tribes in Islamic Syria, which served as the center of the Caliphate during Umayyad rule (661–750). The two principal Himyarite families that established themselves in Homs were the Dhu Asbah and Dhu'l-Kala. The latter had been the most influential family in South Arabia before the advent of Islam there. 

Among the leaders of the conquering Muslim troops was the Himyarite prince Samayfa ibn Nakur of the Dhu'l-Kala. The Asbah chief Kurayb ibn Abraha Abu Rishdin led the Himyar of Homs, but he later moved to Egypt with most of the Dhu Asbah. Members of that family, Abraha ibn Sabbah and his son Abu Shamir, had participated in the Muslim conquest of Egypt in 640–641. Samayfa was another dominant figure of the city and was referred to in the early Muslim sources as the "king of Himyar". During the governorship of Syria by Mu'awiya ibn Abi Sufyan (640s–661), the Himyarites supported him against Caliph Ali during the First Muslim Civil War. At the Battle of Siffin with Ali in 657, Samayfa led the Homs contingent in Mu'awiya's army and was slain. He was succeeded by his son Shurahbil as the power-broker of the Homs tribesmen.

According to the historian Werner Caskel, the Himyar and the other South Arabian tribes of Homs, including the Hamdan, formed a confederation called after their supposed ancestor Qahtan in opposition to the Quda'a confederation, whose constituent tribes had long resided in Syria before the advent of Islam. To the chagrin of the South Arabians in Homs and the Qays tribes of northern Syria, the Quda'a, led by the Banu Kalb tribe, held the supreme position among the tribal groups in the courts of the first Umayyad caliphs Mu'awiya ibn Abi Sufyan and Yazid I. With the strong presence of the Himyarite elite and South Arabian tribesmen in Homs, their scholars there developed and propagated an ideology of Qahtanite preeminence that sought to compete with the elite groups of Islam, including the Quraysh, whose members held the office of the caliph. To that end, they composed and transmitted narratives of the pre-Islamic South Arabian kingdoms, including war stories of these kings' far-flung conquests and heroics and tales of their wealth.

After the deaths of Yazid I and his son and successor Mu'awiya II in 683 and 684, respectively, the Qahtan and the Qays backed the rival caliphate of Abd Allah ibn al-Zubayr, who was based in Mecca, while the Quda'a supported the candidacy of the Umayyad Marwan I. Kurayb ibn Abraha also backed Ibn al-Zubayr in Egypt. The Qahtan joined Ibn al-Zubayr's representative in Syria, Dahhak ibn Qays al-Fihri, in the Battle of Marj Rahit against Marwan and the Quda'a in 684. The latter decisively won that battle. Afterward, Dahhak's commander in Homs, Nu'man ibn Bashir al-Ansari, was tracked down and killed by the Dhu'l-Kala. A member of the family who had served as the head of Yazid I's shurta (select troops), Khalid ibn Ma'dan ibn Abi Karib, decapitated Nu'man and sent his head to Marwan I. Not long after Marj Rahit, Qahtan and Quda'a reconciled under unclear circumstances and formed the super-tribal group of the Yaman in alliance against the Qays. The resulting Qays–Yaman rivalry for political power and privilege persisted through the remainder of Umayyad rule.

In 686 Shurahbil ibn Dhi'l-Kala, the leader of the Himyar in Syria, was slain commanding his troops in the Umayyad army at the Battle of Khazir. As a consequence, the Himyar in Homs "sank to military insignificance", according to the historian Wilferd Madelung. Khalid ibn Ma'dan maintained his position of prestige with the Umayyad dynasty and Syrian Muslim society in general, having shifted to a new role as a prominent Muslim scholar. Kurayb's cousin Ayyub ibn Shurahbil ibn Sabbah served as the governor of Egypt under Caliph Umar II, while a Dhu'l-Kala member, Imran ibn al-Nu'man, served as the Caliph's governor of Sind.

During the Third Muslim Civil War, the Dhu Asbah tribesmen who had remained in South Arabia are recorded among the supporters of the Kharijite leader Abu Hamza. A possible member of the family in Syria, Nadr ibn Yarim, led a summertime military expedition against the Byzantines under the Abbasid caliph al-Saffah.

Ancestral divisions of Himyar
 

Himyar: The most famous of whose septs were Zaid Al-Jamhur, Banu Quda'a and Sakasik.
Kahlan: The most famous of whose septs were Hamdan, Azd, Anmar, Ṭayy (today their descendants are known as Shammar), Midhhij, Kinda, Lakhm, Judham
Kahlan septs emigrated from Yemen to dwell in the different parts of the Arabian Peninsula prior to the Great Flood (Sail Al-‘Arim of Marib Dam), due to the failure of trade under the Roman pressure and domain on both sea and land trade routes following Roman occupation of Egypt and Syria.

Naturally enough, the competition between Kahlan and Ḥimyar led to the evacuation of the first and the settlement of the second in Yemen.

The emigrating septs of Kahlan can be divided into four groups:

Azd: Who, under the leadership of ‘Imrān bin ‘Amr Muzaiqbā’, wandered in Yemen, sent pioneers and finally headed northwards. Details of their emigration can be summed up as follows:
Tha‘labah bin ‘Amr left his tribe Al-Azd for Ḥijāz and dwelt between Tha‘labiyah and Dhī Qār. When he gained strength, he headed for Madīnah where he stayed. Of his seed are Aws and Khazraj, sons of Haritha bin Tha‘labah.
Haritha bin ‘Amr, known as Khuzā‘ah, wandered with his people in Hijaz until they came to Mar Az-Zahran. They conquered the Ḥaram, and settled in Makkah after having driven away its people, the tribe of Jurhum.
‘Imrān bin ‘Amr and his folks went to ‘Oman where they established the tribe of Azd whose children inhabited Tihama and were known as Azd-of-Shanu’a.
Jafna bin ‘Amr and his family, headed for Syria where he settled and initiated the kingdom of Ghassan who was so named after a spring of water, in Ḥijāz, where they stopped on their way to Syria.
Lakhm and Judham: Of whom was Nasr bin Rabi‘a, father of Manadhira, Kings of al-Hirah.
Banū Ṭayy: Who also emigrated northwards to settle by the so- called Aja and Salma Mountains which were consequently named as Tai’ Mountains. The tribe later became the tribe of Shammar.
Kinda: Who dwelt in Bahrain but were expelled to Hadramout and Najd where they instituted a powerful government but not for long, for the whole tribe soon faded away.

Another tribe of Himyar, known as Banū Quḑā'ah, also left Yemen and dwelt in Samāwah on the borders of Iraq.

However, it is estimated that the majority of the Ḥimyar Christian royalty migrated into Jordan, Al-Karak, where initially they were known as Banū Ḥimyar (Sons of Ḥimyar). Many later on moved to central Jordan

See also
Ancient history of Yemen
Rulers of Sheba and Himyar
Tub'a Abu Kariba As'ad
Yemenite Jews
Zafar, Yemen
Ethiopian–Persian wars
List of Jewish states and dynasties
Dhu'l-Kala Samayfa

Notes

References

Bibliography

.

External links 
archiv.ub.uni-heidelberg.de
heidicon.ub.uni-heidelberg.de

Himyarite Kingdom
Former kingdoms
Former monarchies of Asia
110 BC
110s BC establishments
520 disestablishments
520s disestablishments
States and territories established in the 2nd century BC
States and territories disestablished in the 6th century
Groups who converted to Judaism
Jewish polities